The United States embargo against Cuba prevents U.S. businesses, and businesses organized under U.S. law or majority-owned by U.S. citizens, from conducting trade with Cuban interests. It is the most enduring trade embargo in modern history. The US first imposed an embargo on the sale of arms to Cuba on March 14, 1958, during the Fulgencio Batista regime. Again on October 19, 1960, almost two years after the Cuban Revolution had led to the deposition of the Batista regime, the US placed an embargo on exports to Cuba except for food and medicine after Cuba nationalized the US-owned Cuban oil refineries without compensation. On February 7, 1962, the embargo was extended to include almost all exports. The United Nations General Assembly has passed a resolution every year since 1992 demanding the end of the US economic embargo on Cuba, with the US and Israel being the only nations to consistently vote against the resolutions.

, the embargo is enforced mainly through the Trading with the Enemy Act of 1917, the Foreign Assistance Act of 1961, the Cuban Assets Control Regulations of 1963, the Cuban Democracy Act of 1992, the Helms–Burton Act of 1996, and the Trade Sanctions Reform and Export Enhancement Act of 2000. The stated purpose of the Cuban Democracy Act of 1992 is to maintain sanctions on Cuba as long as the Cuban government refuses to move toward "democratization and greater respect for human rights." The Helms-Burton Act further restricted United States citizens from doing commerce in or with Cuba, and mandated restrictions on giving public or private assistance to any successor government in Havana unless and until certain claims against the Cuban government were met. In 1999, President Bill Clinton expanded the trade embargo by also disallowing foreign subsidiaries of U.S. companies to trade with Cuba. In 2000, Clinton authorized the sale of food and humanitarian products to Cuba.

William M. LeoGrande summarized that the embargo against Cuba is "the oldest and most comprehensive US economic sanctions regime against any country in the world" imposed over half a century ago. According to LeoGrande, "the embargo has never been effective at achieving its principal purpose: forcing Cuba's revolutionary regime out of power or bending it to Washington's will."

In Cuba, the embargo is called  (the blockade), despite there being no naval blockade of the country by the United States since the end of the Cuban Missile Crisis. The Cuban government frequently blames the US embargo for the economic problems of Cuba. The United States has threatened to stop financial aid to other countries if they trade non-food items with Cuba. The US's attempts to do so have been vocally condemned by the United Nations General Assembly as an extraterritorial measure that contravenes "the sovereign equality of States, non-intervention in their internal affairs and freedom of trade and navigation as paramount to the conduct of international affairs". Academic Nigel White writes, "While the US measures against Cuba do not amount to a blockade in a technical or formal sense, their cumulative effect is to put an economic stranglehold on the island, which not only prevents the United States intercourse but also effectively blocks commerce with other states, their citizens and companies." Despite the existence of the embargo, Cuba can, and does, conduct international trade with many countries, including many US allies; however, US-based companies, and companies that do business with the US, which trade in Cuba do so at the risk of US sanctions. Cuba has been a member of the World Trade Organization since 1995. The European Union is Cuba's largest trading partner, and the United States is the fifth-largest exporter to Cuba (6.6% of Cuba's imports come from the US). The Cuban government must, however, pay cash for all food imports from the United States, as credit is not allowed.

Beyond criticisms of human rights in Cuba, the United States holds $6 billion worth of financial claims against the Cuban government. The pro-embargo position is that the U.S. embargo is, in part, an appropriate response to these unaddressed claims. The Latin America Working Group argues that pro-embargo Cuban-American exiles, whose votes are crucial in the U.S. state of Florida, have swayed many politicians to adopt views similar to their own. Some business leaders, including James E. Perrella, Dwayne O. Andreas, and Peter Blyth, have opposed the Cuban-American views, arguing that trading freely would be good for Cuba and the United States.

Human-rights groups including Amnesty International, Human Rights Watch, and the Inter-American Commission on Human Rights have also been critical of the embargo. Critics of the embargo often refer to it as a "blockade" and say that the respective laws are too harsh, citing the fact that violations can result in up to 10 years in prison.

History

Eisenhower presidency

The United States imposed an arms embargo on Cuba on March 14, 1958, during the armed conflict of 1953-1958 between rebels led by Fidel Castro and the Fulgencio Batista régime. Arms sales violated U.S. policy which had permitted the sale of weapons to Latin-American countries which had signed the 1947 Inter-American Treaty of Reciprocal Assistance (Rio Treaty) as long as the weapons were not used for hostile purposes. The arms embargo had more of an impact on Batista than on the rebels. After the Castro socialist government came to power on January 1, 1959, relations were initially friendly between Castro and the Dwight D. Eisenhower administration but became strained after the Agricultural Reform confiscated land owned by many American businesses and Cuba continued to sponsor revolutionary movements in other parts of the Caribbean. By March 1960 the US government began making plans to help overthrow the Castro administration. Congress did not want to lift the embargo.

In April 1960, the US Department of State issued a memorandum from Deputy Assistant Secretary of State for Inter-American Affairs Lester D. Mallory to his immediate superior, Roy Rubottom, acknowledging majority support within Cuba for the Castro administration, the fast spread of communism within the country, and the lack of an effective political opposition. The memorandum stated that the "only foreseeable means of alienating internal support is through disenchantment and disaffection based on economic dissatisfaction and hardship." It recommended a policy that would be "adroit and inconspicuous as possible" while aiming to deny "money and supplies to Cuba, to decrease monetary and real wages, to bring about hunger, desperation and overthrow of government."

In May 1960 the Cuban government began regularly and openly purchasing armaments from the Soviet Union, citing the US arms embargo. In July 1960 the United States reduced the import quota of brown sugar from Cuba to 700,000 tons under the Sugar Act of 1948; and the Soviet Union responded by agreeing to purchase the sugar instead.

In June 1960 a key incident occurred: Eisenhower's government refused to export oil to the island, leaving Cuba reliant on Soviet crude oil, which the American companies in Cuba refused to refine. This led the Cuban government to nationalize all three American-owned oil refineries in Cuba in response. The refinery owners were not compensated for the nationalization of their property. The refineries became part of the state-run company, Unión Cuba-Petróleo. This prompted the Eisenhower administration to launch the first trade embargo—a prohibition against selling all products to Cuba except food and medicine. In October 1960 the Cuban administration responded by nationalizing all American businesses and most American privately owned properties on the island. Fidel Castro promised to separate Americans in Cuba from all of their possessions "down to the nails in their shoes". Cuba's nationalization laws required the government to compensate the owners of seized property, but compensation was to be made in Cuban bonds, an offer which was not taken seriously by the United States. Other countries which had their assets nationalised, including Switzerland, Canada, Spain, and France, accepted the terms offered by Cuba. According to Helen Yaffe, an academic specialising in Cuban and Latin American development, compensation offers by the Cuban government were rejected by U.S. property owners at the instruction of the U.S. government.

The second wave of nationalizations prompted the Eisenhower administration, in one of its last actions, to sever all diplomatic relations with Cuba in January 1961. The U.S. partial trade embargo with Cuba continued under the Trading with the Enemy Act 1917. According to 2009 article in the Inter-American Law Review, the Cuban government's nationalization of US owned property is the “largest uncompensated taking of American property by a foreign government in history.” Assets seized, included vacation homes and bank accounts of wealthy individuals, but most seized property was owned by large American corporations, including sugar factories, mines and oil refineries.

Kennedy presidency

About the time of the Bay of Pigs Invasion of 17 to 20 April 1961 (which had been largely planned under the Eisenhower administration, but which  Kennedy had been informed of and had approved during the months preceding his presidency and in his first few months (from January 20, 1961) as president), Castro on April 16, 1961 and on May 1, 1961 characterised the Cuban revolution and state as "socialist",

and aligned with the Soviet Union. On September 4, 1961, partly in response, Congress passed the Foreign Assistance Act, a Cold War Act (among many other measures) that prohibited aid to Cuba and authorized the President to impose a complete trade-embargo against Cuba.

On January 21, 1962, Cuba was suspended by the Organization of American States (OAS), by a vote of 14 in favor, one (Cuba) against with six abstentions. (See Cuba–OAS relations.) Mexico and Ecuador, two abstaining members, argued that the OAS Charter did not authorize expulsion. Multilateral sanctions were imposed by OAS on July 26, 1964, but were later rescinded on July 29, 1975. Cuban relations with the OAS have since improved, and the suspension of membership was lifted on June 3, 2009.

President John F. Kennedy extended measures by executive order, first widening the scope of the trade restrictions on February 8, 1962 (announced on February 3 and again on March 23, 1962). These measures expanded the embargo to include all imports of products containing Cuban goods, even if the final products had been made or assembled outside Cuba. On August 3, 1962, the Foreign Assistance Act was amended to prohibit aid to any country that provides assistance to Cuba. On September 7, 1962, Kennedy formally expanded the Cuban embargo to include all Cuban trade, except for the non-subsidized sale of food and medicines.

Following the Cuban Missile Crisis of October 1962, Kennedy imposed travel restrictions on February 8, 1963, and the Cuban Assets Control Regulations were issued on July 8, 1963, again under the  Trading with the Enemy Act, in response to Cuba hosting Soviet nuclear weapons. These measures froze Cuban assets in the U.S. and consolidated existing restrictions.

Rapprochement with Cuba

The restrictions on U.S. citizens traveling to Cuba lapsed on March 19, 1977; the regulation was renewable every six months, but President Jimmy Carter did not renew it and the regulation on spending U.S. dollars in Cuba was lifted shortly afterwards. President Ronald Reagan reinstated the trade embargo on April 19, 1982, though it was now only restricted to business and tourist travel and did not apply to travel by U.S. government officials, employees of news or film making organizations, persons engaging in professional research, or persons visiting their close relatives.  This has been modified subsequently with the present regulation, effective June 30, 2004, being the Cuban Assets Control Regulations, 31 C.F.R. part 515.

The current regulation does not prohibit travel by U.S. citizens to Cuba per se, but it makes it illegal for U.S. citizens to have transactions (spend money or receive gifts) in Cuba under most circumstances without a US government Office of Foreign Assets Control issued license. Since even paying unavoidable airfare ticket taxes into a Cuban airport would violate this transaction law, it is effectively impossible for ordinary tourists to visit Cuba without breaking the monetary transaction rule.

Increasing legislation

The embargo was reinforced in October 1992 by the Cuban Democracy Act and in 1996 by the Cuban Liberty and Democracy Solidarity Act (known as the Helms–Burton Act) which penalizes foreign companies that do business in Cuba by preventing them from doing business in the U.S. The key sponsor of the Cuban Democracy Act, Democrat Robert Torricelli, stated that the legislation would "wreck havoc on that island." Justification provided for these restrictions was that these companies were trafficking in stolen U.S. properties, and should, thus, be excluded from the United States. President Obama tried to lift the embargo, but congress did not allow it.

The European Union resented the Helms-Burton Act because it felt that the U.S. was dictating how other nations ought to conduct their trade and challenged it on that basis. The EU eventually dropped its challenge in favor of negotiating a solution.

After Cuba shot down two Hermanos al Rescate (Brothers to the Rescue) planes in 1996, killing three Americans and a U.S. resident, a bi-partisan coalition in the United States Congress approved the Helms-Burton Act. The Title III of this law also states that any non-U.S. company that "knowingly trafficks in property in Cuba confiscated without compensation from a U.S. person" can be subjected to litigation and that company's leadership can be barred from entry into the United States. Sanctions may also be applied to non-U.S. companies trading with Cuba. This restriction also applies to maritime shipping, as ships docking at Cuban ports are not allowed to dock at U.S. ports for six months. It's important to note that this title includes waiver authority, so that the President might suspend its application. This waiver must be renewed every six months and traditionally was until United States President Donald Trump in 2019.

In response to pressure from some American farmers and agribusiness, the embargo was relaxed by the Trade Sanctions Reform and Export Enhancement Act, which was passed by the Congress in October 2000 and signed by President Bill Clinton. The relaxation allowed the sale of agricultural goods and medicine to Cuba for humanitarian reasons. Although Cuba initially declined to engage in such trade (having even refused U.S. food aid in the past, seeing it as a half-measure serving U.S. interests), the Cuban government began to allow the purchase of food from the U.S. as a result of Hurricane Michelle in November 2001. These purchases have grown since then, even though all sales are made in cash. In 2007, the U.S. was the largest food supplier of Cuba, and its fifth largest trading partner.

In some tourist spots across the island, American brands such as Coca-Cola can be purchased. Ford tankers refuel planes in airports and some computers use Microsoft software. The origin of the financing behind such goods is not always clear. The goods often come from third parties based in countries outside the U.S., even if the product being dealt originally has U.S. shareholders or investors. This can be seen, for example, with Nestlé products (which have a 10% US ownership) that can be bought in Cuba with Cuban convertible pesos (CUCs). These CUC pesos are hard currency that are traded in foreign exchange against the US dollar, Euro and other currencies.

Cuban thaw

On April 13, 2009, President Barack Obama eased the travel ban, allowing Cuban-Americans to travel freely to Cuba; and on January 14, 2011, he further eased the ban, by allowing students and religious missionaries to travel to Cuba if they meet certain restrictions.

On July 16, 2012, the Ana Cecilia became the first officially sanctioned direct ship to sail from Miami to Cuba. It carried food, medicine and personal hygiene goods sent by Cuban-Americans to family members.

In 2014, the Obama administration announced its intention to re-establish relations with Cuba. In January 2015, the administration lightened restrictions on U.S. citizen travel to Cuba. While restrictions on travel for missionary work and education have been loosened, visits for tourism remain banned. President Obama and President Raúl Castro of Cuba met on April 11, 2015, which was the first meeting between distinct leaders of the two countries in over fifty years. In May 2015, several American companies reported they had been granted licenses to establish ferry travel between Florida and Cuba, with a U.S. Department of Treasury spokeswoman confirming they had begun issuing licenses. So far the general ban on travel to Cuba remains in effect for Americans, so the ferry service will not be accessible to Americans who have not received special approval for travel to Cuba.

On September 21, 2015, the Commerce and Treasury Departments took additional coordinated actions in support of the President's Cuba policy. These actions included a rule published by the Commerce Department's Bureau of Industry and Security (BIS) that amended the terms of existing license exceptions that are available for Cuba, increased the number of license exception provisions that are available for Cuba, created a new Cuba licensing policy to help ensure the safety of civil aviation and the safe operation of commercial passenger aircraft, and made the deemed export and deemed reexport license requirements for Cuba consistent with other sanctioned destinations.

In February 2016, the U.S. Government allowed two American men from Alabama to build a factory that will assemble as many as 1,000 small tractors a year for sale to private farmers in Cuba. The $5 million to $10 million plant would be the first significant U.S. business investment on Cuban soil since 1959. The deal was not authorized by Cuban authorities later that year because one of the owners had recently obtained Cuban citizenship. Factory ownership is still illegal in Cuba.

In concert with a prisoner exchange with Cuba, Presidents Barack Obama and Raúl Castro announced moves on December 17, 2014, to reestablish diplomatic relations and to loosen travel and economic policies. Cuba released Alan Gross, an American prisoner, on humanitarian grounds and exchanged an unnamed American spy for the three remaining members of the Cuban Five. Obama also announced a review of Cuba's status as a terrorist state and an intention to ask Congress to remove the embargo entirely. Cuba agreed to release 53 political prisoners and to allow Red Cross and UN human-rights investigators access. On May 29, 2015, according to the U.S. State Department, "Cuba's designation as a state sponsor of terrorism was rescinded".

Under the announced changes by President Obama, there will be an increased ability to transact with Cuban nationals and businesses, including Cuban financial institutions. Additionally, permitted U.S. banks will now be able to open accredited accounts in Cuban banks.

On January 12, 2017, President Barack Obama announced the immediate cessation of the wet feet, dry feet policy, eight days before his term ended. The Cuban government agreed to accept the return of Cuban nationals. Beginning in 2014, anticipation of the end of the policy had led to increased numbers of Cuban immigrants.

On November 8, 2017, it was announced that President Donald Trump's administration had enacted new rules which would re-enforce the business and travel restrictions which were loosened by the Obama administration and would go into effect on November 9.

In July 2021, under President Joe Biden, the United States imposed sanctions on Cuba's police force and on two of Cuba's leaders in response to the 2021 Cuban protests.

Impact

Humanitarian and health impacts

The embargo has been criticized for its effects on food, clean water, medicine, and other economic needs of the Cuban population. Criticism has come from both Fidel Castro and Raúl Castro, citizens and groups from within Cuba, and international organizations and leaders.

American diplomat Lester D. Mallory wrote an internal memo on April 6, 1960, arguing in favor of an embargo to "to decrease monetary and real wages, to bring about hunger, desperation and overthrow of government".

In 1997, the American Association for World Health stated that the embargo contributed to malnutrition, poor water access, lack of access to medicine and other medical supplies and concluded that "a humanitarian catastrophe has been averted only because the Cuban government has maintained a high level of budgetary support for a health care system designed to deliver primary and preventative medicine to all its citizens."

Some medical scholars, outside Cuba, have linked the embargo to shortages of medical supplies and soap which have resulted in a series of medical crises and heightened levels of infectious diseases. Medical scholars have also linked the embargo to epidemics of specific diseases, including neurological disorders and blindness caused by poor nutrition. An article written in 1997 suggests malnutrition and disease resulting from increased food and medicine prices have affected men and the elderly in particular, due to Cuba's rationing system which gives preferential treatment to women and children.

Although since 2000 the embargo has explicitly excluded the acquisition of food and medicines, a 1997 study by the American Association for World Health (AAWH) and a 1996 article in The Lancet by Anthony F Kirkpatrick of the University of South Florida College of Medicine showed that while the Cuban Democracy Act was amended to allow the de jure export of food and medicines into the country, the de facto application and implications of the act's enforcement significantly restricted the accessibility of both within Cuba. The AAWH stated that "a humanitarian catastrophe has been averted only because the Cuban government has maintained a high level of budgetary support for a healthcare system designed to deliver primary and preventive healthcare to all of its citizens." The AAWH found that travel restrictions embedded in the embargo have limited the amount of medical information that flows into Cuba from the United States.

Political impact
Writing in 2021, in the context of the 2021 Cuban protests, according to Pavel Vidal, a former Central Bank of Cuba economist who teaches at Javeriana University in Colombia, reforms in Cuba "do not depend on the embargo, and the embargo should be eliminated unilaterally, independently from reforms in Cuba. Both cause problems."

Economic effects
The U.S. sanctions on Cuba and their economic impacts can be traced back to when they were first implemented in the 1960s. In its 2020 report to the United Nations, Cuba stated that the total cost to Cuba from the United States embargo is $144 billion since its inception.

In 2012, an economic panel of experts from the Initiative on Global Markets at the University of Chicago Booth School of Business, were asked whether they agree or disagree that "Cuba's low per-capita income growth — 1.2 percent per year since 1960 —has more to do with Cuba's own economic policies than with the U.S. embargo on trade and tourism." The poll found that 49% of economic experts "strongly agree" with the statement, another 49% "agree", 1% were "uncertain", and 0% "disagree" or "strongly disagree" with the statement.

Between 1954 and 1959, trade between Cuba and the United States was at a higher level than what it was in 2003, according to a BA dissertation submitted to the Teresa Lozano Long Institute of Latin American Studies, with 65% of Cuba's total exports sent to the United States while American imports totaled 74% percent of Cuba's international purchases. After the formal implementation of the embargo and the passage of Proclamation 3355, there was a 95% decrease in Cuba's sugar quota, which canceled roughly 700,000 tons of the 3,119,655 tons previously allotted to the United States. A year later, Cuba's sugar quota was reduced to zero when President Eisenhower issued Proclamation 3383. This substantially affected Cuba's total exports, as Cuba was one of the world's leading sugar exporters at the time.

In 1989, with the collapse of the Soviet bloc, Cuba witnessed its most devastating economic crises. Cuba's GDP plummeted 34% and trade between the nations apart from the Council of Mutual Economic Assistance (CMEA) declined by 56%. Between 1989 and 1992, the termination of traditional trade partnerships with the Soviet bloc caused the total value of Cuba's exports to fall by 61% and imports to drop by approximately 72%. This period is known as the Special Period. Supporters of the embargo and many international economists believed that the dissolution of the Soviet Union and the resultant economic crisis would lead to the downfall of Fidel Castro's government. However, Cuba's government instituted a campaign of macroeconomic adjustment and liberalization, which provided significant economic recovery.

In November 1991 speech to the UN General Assembly, the Cuban ambassador Ricardo Alarcón cited 27 recent cases of trade contracts interrupted by US pressure. The British journal Cuba Business claimed that British Petroleum was seemingly dissuaded by US authorities from investing in offshore oil exploration in Cuba despite being initially keenly interested. The Petroleum economist claimed in September 1992 that the US State Department vigorously discouraged firms like Royal Dutch Shell and Clyde Petroleum from investing in Cuba; this pressure did not work in all cases. According to the Mexican newspaper El Financiero, the US ambassador to Mexico John Negroponte travelled to meet two Mexican business men who had signed a textile deal with Cuba on October 17, 1992.  Despite the representation, the deal went ahead and was eventually worth $500 million in foreign capital.  All of this happened before the signing of the Cuban Democracy Act.

The 1998 U.S. State Department report Zenith and Eclipse: A Comparative Look at Socio-Economic Conditions in Pre-Castro and Present Day Cuba attributed Cuba's economic penury not as a result of the embargo, but instead the lack of foreign currency due to the unwillingness of Cuba to liberalize its economy and diversify its export base during the years of abundant Soviet aid. Cuba also amassed substantial debts owed to its Japanese, European, and Latin American trading partners during the years of abundant Soviet aid.

According to a 2001 U.S. International Trade Commission report in response to a request made by the U.S. House of Representatives, the total value of U.S. exports of selected agricultural products, intermediate goods, and manufactured goods to Cuba in the absence of U.S. sanctions was estimated to be at $146 and $658 million for U.S. imports from Cuba between 1996 and 1998.

In 2002, the Cuba Policy Foundation estimated that the embargo costs the U.S. economy $3.6 billion per year in economic output.

In 2007, the United States Commerce's Bureau of Industry and Security (BIS) has become more lenient with some of the sanctions imposed upon Cuba by introducing new streamlined procedures to expedite processing of license applications for exporting eligible agricultural commodities to Cuba. As a result, annual U.S. exports to Cuba have risen from $6 million to about $350 million between 2000 and 2006. Over this period, U.S. exports to Cuba have totaled more than $1.5 billion. As of 2006, agricultural products comprised 98% of total U.S. exports to Cuba.

In 2009, the U.S. Chamber of Commerce estimated that the embargo costs the U.S. economy $1.2 billion per year in lost sales and exports, while the Cuban government estimates that the embargo has cost the island itself $753.69 billion. The Cuba Policy Foundation (CPF) has provided more extreme data; its estimates put the cost of the embargo at $4.84 billion per year while costing Cuba $685 million per year.

According to critics of the embargo, one of the major problems with the embargo is that the United States is the only major country that has such an embargo against Cuba in place. Cuba still receives tourists and trade from other countries, making the embargo appear both illegitimate and pointless.

A 2015 report in Al Jazeera estimated that the embargo had cost the Cuban economy $1.1 trillion in the 55 years since its inception, 
once inflation is taken into account.

Tourist restrictions

Under the Cuban Assets Control Regulations persons subject to U.S. jurisdiction must obtain a license to engage in any travel-related transactions pursuant to travel to, from, and within Cuba. Transactions related solely to tourist travel are not licensable.

Spurred by a burgeoning interest in the assumed untapped product demand in Cuba, a growing number of free-marketers in Congress, backed by Western and Great Plains lawmakers who represent agribusiness, have tried each year since 2000 to water down or lift regulations preventing Americans from traveling to Cuba. Four times over that time period the United States House of Representatives has adopted language lifting the travel ban, and in 2003 the U.S. Senate followed suit for the first time. Each time President George W. Bush threatened to veto the bill. Faced with a veto threat, each year Congress dropped its attempt to lift the travel ban before sending legislation to the president.

Some United States nationals circumvent the ban by traveling to Cuba from a different country, such as Mexico, The Bahamas, Canada or Costa Rica. Cuban immigration authorities do not routinely stamp passports, instead stamping a Cuban visa page which is provided, and not permanently affixed to the passport. However, the practice still opens U.S. citizens to a risk of prosecution and fines by the U.S. government if discovered. Until July 20, 2015, there was no U.S. Embassy or consulate in Cuba and United States representation was limited to a United States Interests Section.

The United States Treasury Department's Office of Foreign Assets Control (OFAC) considers any visit of more than one day to be prima facie proof of violation. OFAC also holds that U.S. citizens may not receive goods or services for free from any Cuban national, eliminating any attempts to circumvent the regulation based on that premise. On July 25, 2011, OFAC declared that the "people to people" relaxation of restrictions on travel conceded by the Obama administration should not be mistakenly interpreted as promoting tourism.

On October 10, 2006, the United States announced the creation of a task force will pursue more aggressively violations of the U.S. trade embargo against Cuba, with severe penalties. The regulations are still in force and are administered by OFAC. Criminal penalties for violating the embargo range up to ten years in prison, $1 million in corporate fines, and $250,000 in individual fines; civil penalties up to $55,000 per violation.

In September 2016, Newsweek reported that then future President Donald Trump's hotel company violated the embargo, spending a minimum of $68,000 for its 1998 foray into Cuba without U.S. government approval. With Trump's knowledge, executives funneled the cash for the Cuba trip through an American consulting firm called Seven Arrows Investment and Development Corp. Once the business consultants traveled to Cuba and incurred the expenses for the venture, Seven Arrows instructed senior officers with Trump's company—then called Trump Hotels & Casino Resorts—how to make it appear legal by linking it after the fact to a charitable effort.

Imports and exports to and from Cuba

United States
The embargo does not block food and medicine goods to Cuba from the United States. In 2020, $176.8 million worth of goods were exported to Cuba from the US and $14.9 million imported to the US from Cuba.

Reactions

Criticism of embargo laws and rules

United Nations
Since 1992, the UN General Assembly has passed a nonbinding resolution every year, except for 2020, condemning the ongoing impact of the embargo and declaring it in violation of the Charter of the United Nations and of international law. There was no voting on this issue in 2020 due to the COVID-19 pandemic. Israel is the only country that routinely joins the U.S. in voting against the resolution as did Palau every year from 2004 to 2008.  In 2010, the General Assembly condemned the embargo, 187 to 2 with 3 abstentions. Israel sided with the U.S., while Marshall Islands, Palau and Micronesia abstained. In 2014, out of the 193-nation assembly, 188 countries voted in favour of the resolution, the United States and Israel voted against, and the Pacific Island nations Palau, Marshall Islands and Micronesia abstained. The United Nations General Assembly voted in favour of a resolution demanding an end to the embargo in both 2021 and 2022. 184 countries voted in favour of the resolution in 2021, while 185 voted in favour in 2022. The United States and Israel voted against in both years. Brazil and Ukraine abstained in both years, while Colombia abstained in 2021.

Response by governments
On May 1, 2009, Venezuelan President Hugo Chávez, while speaking about his meeting U.S. President Barack Obama at a summit days earlier, stated "if President Obama does not dismantle this savage blockade of the Cuban people, then it is all a lie, it will all be a great farce and the U.S. empire will be alive and well, threatening us."

The Helms-Burton Act has been the target of criticism from Canadian and European governments in particular, who object to what they say is the extraterritorial pretensions of a piece of legislation aimed at punishing non-U.S. corporations and non-U.S. investors who have economic interests in Cuba. In the House of Commons of Canada, Helms-Burton was mocked by the introduction of the Godfrey-Milliken Bill, which called for the return of property of United Empire Loyalists seized by the American government as a result of the American Revolution (the bill never became law). The European Council has stated that it:

Other critics
Some critics of the embargo say that the embargo helps the Cuban government more than it hurts it, by providing it with a bogeyman for all of Cuba's misfortunes. Hillary Clinton publicly shared the view that the embargo helps the Castros, saying that "It is my personal belief that the Castros do not want to see an end to the embargo and do no want to see normalization with the United States, because they would lose all of their excuses for what hasn't happened in Cuba in the last 50 years." Clinton said in the same interview that "we're open to changing with them."

In a 2005 interview, George P. Shultz, who served as Secretary of State under Reagan, called the embargo "insane". Daniel Griswold, director of the Cato Institute's Center for Trade Policy Studies, criticized the embargo in a June 2009 article:

In June 2009, Venezuela commentator Moisés Naím wrote in Newsweek: "The embargo is the perfect example used by anti-Americans everywhere to expose the hypocrisy of a superpower that punishes a small island while cozying to dictators elsewhere." Commentators cite examples such as Saudi Arabia, Turkey, and China, as regimes that the United States has varying economic relations with.

Some American business leaders openly call for an end to the embargo. They argue, as long as the embargo continues, non-U.S. foreign businesses in Cuba that violate the embargo, do not have to compete with U.S. businesses, and thus, will have a head start when and if the embargo is lifted.

Some religious leaders oppose the embargo for a variety of reasons, including humanitarian and economic restrictions the embargo imposes on Cubans. Pope John Paul II called for the end to the embargo during his 1979 pastoral visit to Mexico. Patriarch Bartholomew I called the embargo a "historic mistake" while visiting the island on January 25, 2004. Rev. Jesse Jackson, Rev. Al Sharpton, and Minister Louis Farrakhan have also publicly opposed the embargo. On May 15, 2002, former President Jimmy Carter spoke in Havana, calling for an end to the embargo, saying "Our two nations have been trapped in a destructive state of belligerence for 42 years, and it is time for us to change our relationship." The US bishops called for an end to the embargo on Cuba, after Pope Benedict XVI's 2012 visit to the island.

Film director Michael Moore challenged the embargo by bringing 9/11 rescue workers in need of health care to Cuba to obtain subsidized health care.

In June 2011, former Democratic presidential candidate George McGovern blamed "embittered Cuban exiles in Miami" for keeping the embargo alive. Before visiting Cuba, he said:

Barack Obama discussed easing the embargo during his 2008 campaign for president of the U.S., though he promised to maintain it. In December 2014, he called the embargo a failure, asking the U.S. Congress to enact legislation to lift it entirely.

Polling data and public opinion in the US
A 2008 USA Today/Gallup Poll indicated that Americans believed that diplomatic relations "should" be re-established with Cuba, with 61% in favor and 31% opposed.

In January 2012, an Angus Reid Public Opinion poll showed that 57% of Americans called for ending the travel ban that prevented most Americans from visiting Cuba, with 27% disagreeing and 16% not sure.

The Cuban Research Institute at Florida International University has conducted thirteen polls (from 1991 to 2020) of Cuban Americans in Dade County, Florida In 1991, support for the embargo was 67.9% (5.5% don't know) shortly after the end of the Cold War, bottoming out at 31.6% (9.4% don't know) in 2016 during the Cuban thaw, and back up to 54% (8% don't know) in 2020 after the Trump administration reversed the thaw.

In the US, lobbying groups such as Engage Cuba advocate for the end of the embargo.

See also

 ABCD line (sanctions against Japan)
 Sanctions against Russia
 List of vetoed United Nations Security Council resolutions
 Sanctions against Iraq
 Sanctions against Iran

References

Boycotts of Cuba
Embargoes
Economy of Cuba
Cuba–United States relations
Anti-communism in the United States
Cold War history of Cuba
Cold War history of the United States
Cuba and the United Nations
Opposition to Fidel Castro
Tourism in Cuba
Aftermath of the Cuban Revolution
History of the foreign relations of the United States
1958 in international relations
1958 establishments in Cuba
1958 establishments in the United States
20th century in Cuba
21st century in Cuba
Cuba